Quinan, (located on Highway 308) is a small French Acadian village in Yarmouth County, Nova Scotia, about 20 minutes inland from the town of Yarmouth and has approximately 320 inhabitants.

History
In the 18th and 19th centuries the community was  called "The Forks" or "Tusket Forks" due the Tusket River passing through the village which stretches out in three branches, the Upper Tusket River, the Lower Tusket River and the Quinan River.

On May 15, 1885, the community held a public meeting and unanimously votedchange the name of their community to Quinan to honour Father John J. Quinan, a Roman Catholic priest, who served as the parish priest from 1860 to 1867.

Every year, during the Labour Day weekend in September, the community welcomes people from everywhere for their Annual Labour Day Picnic. In 2008, Quinan celebrated its 125th Annual Picnic which has activities like bingo, rose tables and rides.

Each Spring, the community hosts a Wild Game Evening that includes a supper and auction that attracts more people than can be served.

Quinan is well known for its fishing and hunting places. Many famous people have visited the village, including Babe Ruth in the fall of 1935.

In the past decade, Quinan has been known for having widespread flooding. April 3, 2003, the first flood in more than forty years occurred. Recently, November 8–12, 2010, Quinan, yet again, had huge flooding This was due to an unusual storm system that poured more than 300mm of rain in a short time period.

Common family names in Quinan are Muise, Frontain/Frotten/Fraughton, Doucette/Doucet, Blanchard, Dulong, Melanson, Vacon and Jacquard.

References

General Service Areas in Nova Scotia
Communities in Yarmouth County